Magik Seven: Live in Los Angeles is the seventh and final album in the Magik series by well-known trance DJ and producer Tiësto, released in 2001 in the Netherlands. As with the rest of the Magik series, the album is a live turntable mix.

Track listing
 The Auranaut – "People Want to Be Needed" – 7:44
 Three Drives – "Sunset on Ibiza" – 3:45
 Schiller – "Das Glockenspiel" [Humate remix] – 3:33
 Ballroom – "Come Along!" [Chrome remix] – 5:51 (Mislabeled, Original Name is Ballroom – "Come Along!" [Original Mix])
 Insigma – "Open Your Eyes" [Original Insigma mix] – 5:51
 Jan Johnston – "Flesh" [DJ Tiësto mix] – 6:09
 Riva – "Stringer" – 5:15
 M.I.K.E. – "Sunrise at Palamos" – 4:19
 Push – "Strange World" [2000 remake] – 4:14
 Utah Saints – "Lost Vagueness" [Oliver Lieb's main mix] – 4:05
 DJ Arabesque – "The Vision" [Bass Control] – 4:12
 DJ Tiësto – "Flight 643" – 5:31
 The Green Martian – "Industry" – 4:05
 Planisphere – "Moonshine" – 6:19
 CJ Bolland – "The Prophet" – 5:37

References

Tiësto compilation albums
2001 compilation albums
Black Hole Recordings albums